Damiano Lenzi (born 14 August 1987, Domodossola, VB, Piedmont, Italy) is an Italian ski mountaineer and cross-country skier, Italian Army member, Mountain Warfare Troops ("Alpini").

Selected results 
 2009:
 1st, European Championship relay race (together with Dennis Brunod, Manfred Reichegger and Lorenzo Holzknecht)
 1st, "Pizzo Tre Signori"
 1st, "Trofeo Fiou" race (together with Dennis Brunod)
 2nd, Trofeo Mezzalama (together with Jean Pellissier and Daniele Pedrini)
 6th, European Championship vertical race
 2010:
 1st, World Championship relay race (together with Lorenzo Holzknecht, Dennis Brunod and Manfred Reichegger)
 3rd, World Championship team race (together with Lorenzo Holzknecht)
 6th, World Championship vertical race
 6th, World Championship combination ranking
 7th, World Championship single race
 2011:
 4th, World Championship vertical race
 4th, World Championship team race (together with Pietro Lanfranchi)
 7th, World Championship vertical, total ranking
 2012:
 3rd, European Championship relay, together with Matteo Eydallin, Manfred Reichegger and Robert Antonioli
 4th, European Championship team, together with Michele Boscacci
 2013:
 1st, Trofeo Mezzalama (together with Manfred Reichegger and Matteo Eydallin)

Pierra Menta 

 2010: 4th, together with Lorenzo Holzknecht
 2011: 5th, together with Manfred Reichegger
 2014: 1st, together with Matteo Eydallin
 2015: 1st, together with Matteo Eydallin
 2017: 1st, together with Matteo Eydallin

Trofeo Mezzalama 

 2013: 1st, together with Manfred Reichegger (IT), Matteo Eydallin (IT) - Centro Sportivo Esercito (Italian Army Sporting Center Team): 04:16:37;

External links 
 
 Damiano Lenzi, skimountaineering.org
 Interview (Italian)

References 

1987 births
Living people
Italian male ski mountaineers
World ski mountaineering champions
Italian male cross-country skiers
Italian sky runners